The 19th Infantry Division was a formation of the German Wehrmacht during World War II.

History
Originally formed 1 October 1934 as Artillerieführer VI in Hannover, the division was renamed 19. Infanterie-Division on 15 October 1935. Mobilized on 25 August 1939 the division participated in the Invasion of Poland and the Battle of France. After the French campaign, the division was reorganized as a tank division and on 1 November 1940 was renamed 19th Panzer Division.

Commanders
The commanders of the division:
General der Kavallerie Konrad von Goßler 1 October 1934 – 1 March 1938
Generalleutnant Günther Schwantes 1 March 1938 – 1 February 1940
Generalmajor Otto von Knobelsdorff 1 February 1940 – 1 November 1940

Citations

References
 
 
 

0*019
Military units and formations established in 1934
1934 establishments in Germany
Military units and formations disestablished in 1940